Isaac Posch (1591–1622) was an Austrian composer and organist. He is chiefly known for his contribution to dance music Musicalische Ehrenfreudt 1618, and Musicalische Tafelfreudt 1621.  Posch died in Ljubljana, Slovenia.

References

1623 deaths
Austrian classical composers
Austrian organists
Male organists
Austrian Baroque composers
Renaissance composers
Year of birth unknown
17th-century classical composers
Austrian male classical composers
17th-century male musicians
1591 births